Mo Church is a parish church of the Church of Norway in Rana Municipality in Nordland county, Norway. It is located in the town of Mo i Rana. It is the church for the Mo parish which is part of the Indre Helgeland prosti (deanery) in the Diocese of Sør-Hålogaland. The white, cruciform, wooden church was built in a neo-gothic style in 1724 using plans drawn up by the architects Andreas Grenstad and Espen Poulson. The church seats about 400 people.

History
The church in Mo i Rana was founded in 1723-1724 when missionary Thomas von Westen led the construction of the new church. The first worship service held in the new church was on 6 January 1724. In 1832 the church underwent a renovation and expansion of the building. It included building a higher and steeper roof with a small onion dome tower on top. In 1860, the interior was redesigned. The church also underwent renovations in 1956 and again in 2007.

Media gallery

See also
List of churches in Sør-Hålogaland

References

Rana, Norway
Churches in Nordland
Wooden churches in Norway
Cruciform churches in Norway
18th-century Church of Norway church buildings
Churches completed in 1724
1724 establishments in Norway